Southern Cross is a 12-metre class racing yacht, constructed in Terry Hills by Halvorsen Morson and Gowland of Mona Vale.  Perth entrepreneur Alan Bond funded the project and was designed by Australian designer Ben Lexcen. Southern Cross is 68 feet long, weighs 32 tonnes and has a mast that is 97 feet high. It was the first Aluminium yacht to compete in the America's Cup.

Career

America's Cup
Although unsuccessful in beating the Americans in the 1974 America's Cup, Southern Cross did beat the competing nations to win the right to challenge for the cup.

Today
Southern Cross provides chartered overnight sailing trips in the Whitsundays. The conversion of Southern Cross to a charter yacht took two years and included construction of a toilet and shower, beds, kitchen/galley and dining area. The deck was modified to include two cockpits and a motor was fitted.

Ships of Australia
America's Cup challengers
1970s sailing yachts
Sailing yachts designed by Ben Lexcen
Louis Vuitton Cup yachts
1974 America's Cup